Angry People in Local Newspapers is a website and a series of social media accounts.

History
Angry People in Local Newspapers was started by Alistair Coleman, a journalist at the BBC. It was started by Coleman as a blog after he read a story with the headline "Naked neighbour put me off men and sausages". The primary outlet for Angry People in Local Newspapers was later changed to a Facebook page. A book, titled Angry People in Local Newspapers: The break-out stars of 2018, was published in 2018.

Content
Angry People in Local Newspapers shares articles from local newspapers, including reader's letters. It is also known for the cliched photographs it shares.

References

External links
Official website

British blogs
News blogs
2009 establishments in the United Kingdom